Sad ol Din (also known as Sa‘d od Dīn and Sa‘d ed Dīn) is a village in Kavir Rural District, Sheshtaraz District, Khalilabad County, Razavi Khorasan Province, Iran. At the 2006 census, its population was 1,965, in 533 families.

References 

Populated places in Khalilabad County